LDS Moapa Stake Office Building, also known as the Virmoa Maternity Hospital, is listed on the National Register of Historic Places in Overton, Nevada.  It was built between 1917 and 1919 to serve the community of Moapa Valley as a local office, classroom and records repository for the LDS Church. In 1939, the local stake decided to relocate their offices to Las Vegas as travel between the communities became easier. The building then sat vacant.

In 1940, the Southern Nevada Memorial Hospital leased the building and converted it into a hospital which opened on January 9, 1941 as the Virmoa Maternity Hospital. The name "Virmoa" is a contraction of Virgin and Moapa. The hospital then was changed into an emergency room in the 1960s. In 1970, the emergency room closed and the Daughters of Utah Pioneers purchased the building for use as a meeting hall and museum. It was listed in the National Register of Historic Places for its association with the development of Moapa Valley as a religious and later a medical site.

References 

National Register of Historic Places in Clark County, Nevada
Buildings and structures in Overton, Nevada
Defunct hospitals in Nevada
Hospitals in Clark County, Nevada
Maternity hospitals in the United States
The Church of Jesus Christ of Latter-day Saints in Nevada
Museums in Clark County, Nevada
History museums in Nevada
Religious buildings and structures completed in 1919
Former Latter Day Saint church buildings
Former churches in Nevada
Nevada State Register of Historic Places
Properties of religious function on the National Register of Historic Places in Nevada
Hospital buildings on the National Register of Historic Places in Nevada
Hospital buildings completed in 1941
Hospitals disestablished in 1970
History of women in Nevada